William Healy (born September 29, 2001) is a Canadian television actor, known for Arthur (1996–2022 TV show) voicing the title character for the 18th and 19th seasons (replacing Drew Adkins), and also Warehouse 13 (2009).

Biography
William Healy was born September 29, 2001 in Toronto, Ontario, Canada to actor/teacher Christopher Healy.

William continues his actor training and attends an Arts school in Toronto.  He earned his Black Belt in Taekwondo with gold medals in competition.

Filmography

External links

2001 births
Canadian male child actors
Canadian male film actors
Canadian male voice actors
Living people
Male actors from Toronto